Raymond Eugene Wells (born August 20, 1980) is a former American football linebacker who played two seasons in the National Football League with the Tennessee Titans and San Francisco 49ers. He played college football at the University of Arizona and attended Mount Miguel High School in Spring Valley, California. He was also a member of the Denver Broncos.

Professional career

San Francisco 49ers
Wells was signed by the San Francisco 49ers on May 2, 2003 after going undrafted in the 2003 NFL Draft. He was released by the 49ers on August 31, 2003.

Tennessee Titans
Wells signed with the Tennessee Titans on September 2, 2003. He was released by the Titans on September 7, 2004.

San Francisco 49ers
Wells was signed by the San Francisco 49ers on October 13, 2004. He was released by the 49ers on October 20 and re-signed on October 25, 2004. He was released by the 49ers on September 3, 2005.

Denver Broncos
Wells signed with the Denver Broncos on April 20, 2006. He was released by the Broncos on September 2, 2006.

References

External links
Just Sports Stats
NFL Draft Scout

Living people
1980 births
Players of American football from Oakland, California
American football linebackers
African-American players of American football
Arizona Wildcats football players
Tennessee Titans players
San Francisco 49ers players
21st-century African-American sportspeople
20th-century African-American people